Mario Rossi may refer to: 
 Mario Rossi (architect) (1897–1961), an Italian architect who designed prominent Islamic buildings
 Mario Rossi (conductor) (1902–1992), a prominent Italian conductor
 Mario Rossi (racing driver) (1932–?), an American NASCAR racer and team owner

See also
 Mario Roshi (1994–), an Albanian footballer
 Mario Rossy (1962–), a jazz musician